The 1994 Star World Championships were held in Portorož, Slovenia between September 13 and 18, 1998.

Results

References
 http://www.starclass.org/history/1990-worlds.shtml

Star World Championships
1998 in sailing
Sailing competitions in Slovenia